Icelandic is a North Germanic language spoken by about 314,000 people, the vast majority of whom live in Iceland, where it is the national language. Due to being a West Scandinavian language, it is most closely related to Faroese, western Norwegian dialects, and the extinct language Norn.

The language is more conservative than most other Germanic languages. While most of them have greatly reduced levels of inflection (particularly noun declension), Icelandic retains a four-case synthetic grammar (comparable to German, though considerably more conservative and synthetic) and is distinguished by a wide assortment of irregular declensions. Icelandic vocabulary is also deeply conservative, with the country's language regulator maintaining an active policy of coining terms based on older Icelandic words rather than directly taking in loanwords from other languages. Since the written language has not changed much, Icelandic speakers can read classic Old Norse literature created in the 10th through 13th centuries (such as the Eddas and sagas) with relative ease.

Icelandic is closely related to Faroese; the written forms of the two languages are very similar, but their spoken forms are not mutually intelligible. It is not mutually intelligible with the continental Scandinavian languages (Danish, Norwegian, and Swedish) and is more distinct from the most widely spoken Germanic languages, English and German.

Aside from the 300,000 Icelandic speakers in Iceland, Icelandic is spoken by about 8,000 people in Denmark, 5,000 people in the United States, and more than 1,400 people in Canada, notably in the region known as New Iceland in Manitoba which was settled by Icelanders beginning in the 1880s.

The state-funded Árni Magnússon Institute for Icelandic Studies serves as a centre for preserving the medieval Icelandic manuscripts and studying the language and its literature. The Icelandic Language Council, comprising representatives of universities, the arts, journalists, teachers, and the Ministry of Culture, Science and Education, advises the authorities on language policy. Since 1995, on 16 November each year, the birthday of 19th-century poet Jónas Hallgrímsson is celebrated as Icelandic Language Day.

History 

The oldest preserved texts in Icelandic were written around 1100 AD. Many of the texts are based on poetry and laws traditionally preserved orally. The most famous of the texts, which were written in Iceland from the 12th century onward, are the sagas of Icelanders, which encompass the historical works and the Poetic Edda.

The language of the sagas is Old Icelandic, a western dialect of Old Norse. The Dano-Norwegian, then later Danish rule of Iceland from 1536 to 1918 had little effect on the evolution of Icelandic (in contrast to the Norwegian language), which remained in daily use among the general population. Though more archaic than the other living Germanic languages, Icelandic changed markedly in pronunciation from the 12th to the 16th century, especially in vowels (in particular, and /).

The modern Icelandic alphabet has developed from a standard established in the 19th century, primarily by the Danish linguist Rasmus Rask. It is based strongly on an orthography laid out in the early 12th century by a document referred to as the First Grammatical Treatise by an anonymous author, who has later been referred to as the First Grammarian. Various archaic features, as the letter , had not been used much in later centuries. Rask's standard constituted a major change in practice.

Apart from the addition of new vocabulary, written Icelandic has not changed substantially since the 11th century, when the first texts were written on vellum. Modern speakers can understand the original sagas and Eddas which were written about eight hundred years ago. The sagas are usually read with updated modern spelling and footnotes, but otherwise are intact (as with recent English editions of Shakespeare's works). With some effort, many Icelanders can also understand the original manuscripts.

Legal status and recognition 
According to an act passed by the Parliament in 2011, Icelandic is "the national language of the Icelandic people and the official language in Iceland"; moreover, "[p]ublic authorities shall ensure that its use is possible in all areas of Icelandic society".

Iceland is a member of the Nordic Council, a forum for co-operation between the Nordic countries, but the council uses only Danish, Norwegian and Swedish as its working languages (although the council does publish material in Icelandic). Under the Nordic Language Convention, since 1987 Icelandic citizens have had the right to use Icelandic when interacting with official bodies in other Nordic countries, without becoming liable for any interpretation or translation costs. The convention covers visits to hospitals, job centres, the police and social security offices. It does not have much effect since it is not very well known, and because those Icelanders not proficient in the other Scandinavian languages often have a sufficient grasp of English to communicate with institutions in that language (although there is evidence that the general English skills of Icelanders have been somewhat overestimated). The Nordic countries have committed to providing services in various languages to each other's citizens, but this does not amount to any absolute rights being granted, except as regards criminal and court matters.

Phonology 

Icelandic has very minor dialectal differences phonetically. The language has both monophthongs and diphthongs, and consonants can be voiced or unvoiced.

Voice plays a primary role in the differentiation of most consonants including the nasals but excluding the plosives. The plosives b, d, and g are voiceless and differ from p, t, and k only by their lack of aspiration. Preaspiration occurs before geminate (long or double consonants) p, t, and k. It does not occur before geminate b, d, or g. Pre-aspirated tt is analogous etymologically and phonetically to German and Dutch cht (compare Icelandic ,  with the German ,  and the Dutch).

Consonants 

  are laminal denti-alveolar,  is apical alveolar,  are alveolar non-sibilant fricatives; the former is laminal, while the latter is usually apical.
 The voiceless continuants  are always constrictive , but the voiced continuants  are not very constrictive and are usually pronounced closer to approximants  than fricatives .
 The rhotic consonants may either be trills  or taps , depending on the speaker.
 A phonetic analysis reveals that the voiceless lateral approximant  is, in practice, usually realised with considerable friction, especially word-finally or syllable-finally, i. e., essentially as a voiceless alveolar lateral fricative .

 includes three extra phones: .

Many competing analyses have been proposed for Icelandic phonemes. The problems stem from complex but regular alternations and mergers among the above phones in various positions.

Vowels

Grammar 

Icelandic retains many grammatical features of other ancient Germanic languages, and resembles Old Norwegian before much of its fusional inflection was lost. Modern Icelandic is still a heavily inflected language with four cases: nominative, accusative, dative and genitive. Icelandic nouns can have one of three grammatical genders: masculine, feminine or neuter. There are two main declension paradigms for each gender: strong and weak nouns, and these are further divided into subclasses of nouns, based primarily on the genitive singular and nominative plural endings of a particular noun. For example, within the strong masculine nouns, there is a subclass (class 1) that declines with -s in the genitive singular and -ar in the nominative plural. However, there is another subclass (class 3) of strong masculine nouns that always declines with -ar in the genitive singular and -ir in the nominative plural. Additionally, Icelandic permits a quirky subject, that is, certain verbs have subjects in an oblique case (i.e. other than the nominative).

Nouns, adjectives and pronouns are declined in the four cases and for number in the singular and plural.

Verbs are conjugated for tense, mood, person, number and voice. There are three voices: active, passive and middle (or medial), but it may be debated whether the middle voice is a voice or simply an independent class of verbs of its own, as every middle-voice verb has an active-voice ancestor, but sometimes with drastically different meaning, and the middle-voice verbs form a conjugation group of their own. In each of these examples, the meaning has been so altered, that one can hardly see them as the same verb in different voices. Verbs have up to ten tenses, but Icelandic, like English, forms most of them with auxiliary verbs.
Many transitive verbs (i.e. they require an object), can take a reflexive pronoun instead. The case of the pronoun depends on the case that the verb governs. As for further classification of verbs, Icelandic behaves much like other Germanic languages, with a main division between weak verbs and strong, and the strong verbs, of which there are about 150 to 200, are divided into six classes plus reduplicative verbs. They still make up some of the most frequently used verbs. ("to be", is the example par excellence, having two subjunctives and two imperatives in addition to being made up of different stems.) There is also a class of auxiliary verbs, called the  verbs (4 or 5, depending on who is counting), and the oddity  ("to cause"), called the only totally irregular verb in Icelandic although every form of it is caused by common and regular sound changes.

The basic word order in Icelandic is subject–verb–object. However, as words are heavily inflected, the word order is fairly flexible, and every combination may occur in poetry; SVO, SOV, VSO, VOS, OSV and OVS are all allowed for metrical purposes. However, as with most Germanic languages, Icelandic usually complies with the V2 word order restriction, so the conjugated verb in Icelandic usually appears as the second element in the clause, preceded by the word or phrase being emphasised. For example:
  (I know it not.)
  (Not know I it. )
  (It know I not.)
  (I went to Britain when I was one year old.)
  (To Britain went I, when I was one year old.)
  (When I was one year old, went I to Britain.)

A distinction between formal and informal address (T–V distinction) had existed in Icelandic from the 17th century, but use of the formal variant weakened in the 1950s and rapidly disappeared. It no longer exists in regular speech, but may occasionally be found in pre-written speeches addressed to the bishop and members of parliament.

Vocabulary 

Early Icelandic vocabulary was largely Old Norse. The introduction of Christianity to Iceland in the 11th century brought with it a need to describe new religious concepts. The majority of new words were taken from other Scandinavian languages;  ("church"), for example. Numerous other languages have influenced Icelandic: French brought many words related to the court and knightship; words in the semantic field of trade and commerce have been borrowed from Low German because of trade connections. In the late 18th century, language purism began to gain noticeable ground in Iceland and since the early 19th century it has been the linguistic policy of the country (see linguistic purism in Icelandic). Nowadays, it is common practice to coin new compound words from Icelandic derivatives.

Icelandic personal names are patronymic (and sometimes matronymic) in that they reflect the immediate father or mother of the child and not the historic family lineage. This system, which was formerly used throughout the Nordic area and beyond, differs from most Western systems of family name. In most Icelandic families, the ancient tradition of patronymics is still in use; i.e. a person uses their father's name (usually) or mother's name (increasingly in recent years) in the genitive form followed by the morpheme -son ("son") or -dóttir ("daughter") in lieu of family names.

In 2019, changes were announced to the laws governing names.

Cognates with English 
As Icelandic shares its ancestry with English and both are Germanic languages, there are many cognate words in both languages; each have the same or a similar meaning and are derived from a common root. The possessive, though not the plural, of a noun is often signified with the ending , as in English. Phonological and orthographical changes in each of the languages will have changed spelling and pronunciation. A few examples are given below.

Language policy 

A core theme of Icelandic language ideologies is grammatical, orthographic and lexical purism for Icelandic. This is evident in general language discourses, in polls, and in other investigations into Icelandic language attitudes. The general consensus on Icelandic language policy has come to mean that language policy and language ideology discourse are not predominantly state or elite driven; but rather, remain the concern of lay people and the general public. The Icelandic speech community is perceived to have a protectionist language culture; however, this is deep-rooted ideologically primarily in relation to the forms of the language, while Icelanders in general seem to be more “pragmatic” as to domains of language use.

Linguistic purism 

During the 19th century, a movement was started by writers and other educated people of the country to rid the language of foreign words as much as possible and to create a new vocabulary and adapt the Icelandic language to the evolution of new concepts, thus avoiding the use of borrowed neologisms as are found in many other languages. Many old words which had fallen into disuse were recycled and given new senses in the modern language, and neologisms were created from Old Norse roots. For example, the word  ("electricity"), literally means "amber power", calquing the derivation of the Greek root "electr-" from Greek  ("amber").

Writing system 

The Icelandic alphabet is notable for its retention of two old letters that no longer exist in the English alphabet: Þ, þ (modern English "thorn") and Ð, ð (anglicised as "eth" or "edh"), representing the voiceless and voiced "th" sounds (as in English thin and this), respectively. The complete Icelandic alphabet is:

The letter  officially replaced  in 1929, although it had been used in early manuscripts (until the 14th century) and again periodically from the 18th century. The letter  was formerly in the Icelandic alphabet, but it was officially removed in 1973.

See also 
 Basque–Icelandic pidgin (a pidgin that was used to trade with Basque whalers)
 Icelandic exonyms
 Icelandic literature
 Icelandic name

Notes

References

Bibliography

Further reading 
 Icelandic: Grammar, Text and Glossary (1945; 2000) by Stefán Einarsson. Johns Hopkins University Press, .

External links 

 The Icelandic Language, an overview of the language from the Icelandic Ministry for Foreign Affairs.
 BBC Languages – Icelandic, with audio samples
 Icelandic: at once ancient and modern, a 16-page pamphlet with an overview of the language from the Icelandic Ministry of Education, Science and Culture, 2001.
The New World Translation of the Christian Greek Scriptures in Icelandic, the modern bible translation, published by Jehovah's Witnesses, both printed and online versions, 2019.
 Íslensk málstöð (The Icelandic Language Institute) 
  Lexicographical Institute of Háskóli Íslands / Orðabók Háskóla Íslands 
https://www.worlddata.info/languages/icelandic.php

Dictionaries 
 Icelandic-English Dictionary / Íslensk-ensk orðabók Sverrir Hólmarsson, Christopher Sanders, John Tucker. Searchable dictionary from the University of Wisconsin–Madison Libraries
 Icelandic – English Dictionary: from Webster's Rosetta Edition.
 Collection of Icelandic bilingual dictionaries
 Old Icelandic-English Dictionary by Richard Cleasby and Gudbrand Vigfusson

 
West Scandinavian languages
North Germanic languages
Languages of Iceland
Subject–verb–object languages
Verb-second languages